General elections were held in Costa Rica on Sunday, 2 February 2014 to elect a new president, two vice presidents, and 57 Legislative Assembly lawmakers. In accordance with Article 132 of the constitution, incumbent President Laura Chinchilla Miranda was ineligible to run for a second consecutive term.

The ruling National Liberation Party put forward San José Mayor Johnny Araya Monge as its presidential candidate; the Libertarian Movement party nominated former legislator Otto Guevara Guth; the leftist Broad Front nominated José María Villalta Florez-Estrada; and the center-left Citizens' Action Party nominated  Luis Guillermo Solís Rivera.

Opinion polls in December 2013 showed Araya ahead with 37 percent, Villalta close behind at 32 percent, Guevara at 15 percent, and Solís trailing at eight percent, suggesting the likelihood of a run-off vote in February. Villalta's strong showing in the polls caused concern among Araya supporters and business leaders in Costa Rica. La Nacion, Costa Rica's most important newspaper and a historical ally of Liberacion Nacional, began a concerted series of attacks against Villalta, comparing him to Venezuela's Hugo Chávez. Political experts later concluded that this focus on Villalta helped Luis Guillermo Solis in the election.

In the presidential election, Solís and Araya came first and second, respectively, with neither candidate reaching 40 percent of the valid poll in the first round of voting, so a second round of voting was held from 6am to 6pm on 6 April, the first run-off election since 2002.

In a surprise move, Araya announced on 6 March that he would abandon his campaign for the run-off election. He stated that after weighing his chances it was only sensible to withdraw from the campaign. Recent polls had indicated that he was trailing badly behind Solís and he believed that spending money on campaigning was not prudent. Although Araya's action effectively handed the presidency to Solís, the run-off still had to take place since Costa Rican law does not allow for a candidate to withdraw from a run-off election. Ultimately, Solís won the second round with 78 percent of the vote, a historic high in Costa Rica. Unlike the first round, Solís won a majority in every province.

Presidential candidates 
There were thirteen political parties on the 2014 ballot, each one with their corresponding ticket of a president and two vice-presidents.

Opinion polls 
If no candidate surmounts the 40% threshold, the two candidates who would qualify for the runoff are marked. No poll accurately predicted the first or second round voting results.

Results

President
The results of the first-round final count were declared on 17 February 2014, with the results of the second-round eighth count being declared on 7 April 2014:

By province
First round

Second round

Legislative Assembly
Although Solís' PAC received the most votes in the presidential elections, the party did not won in the parliamentary voting making PLN the largest party in the Assembly with 18 deputies over PAC's 13.

Leftist party Broad Front surprised with its results, achieving 9 seats, first time ever that the Left achieved such a big number. Social Christian Unity Party recovered part of its former influence by turning into the fourth political party in legislative size even when its candidate Rodolfo Piza was fifth in the presidential vote. The opposite happened to Otto Guevara’s right-wing Libertarian Movement, fourth in presidential votes, which stood fifth in legislative elections, and as a result, the number of its deputies was reduced from 9 to 4. Oscar Lopez’s PASE party also suffered a diminishment in number of deputies from 4 to 1 (Lopez himself).

Three Christian parties, oriented toward the Protestant minority and very socially conservative, also achieved deputies: Costa Rican Renewal Party 2, National Restoration 1 and Christian Democratic Alliance 1.

By province

Candidates elected
Fifty-seven legislators were elected and took office on 1 May 2014, eleven of whom had been members of the Legislative Assembly in the past. Five were from the National Liberation Party: Antonio Álvarez Desanti, Juan Luis Jiménez, Olivier Jiménez, Rolando González, and Sandra Piszk. Two were from the Citizen Action Party: Epsy Campbell and Ottón Solís. Mario Redondo of the Christian Democratic Alliance served previously with the Social Christian Unity Party. The others were Otto Guevara of the Libertarian Movement Party, Oscar López of Accessibility Without Exclusion, and Jorge Rodríguez of the Social Christian Unity Party. The full list is as follows:

References

Elections in Costa Rica
Costa Rica
general election
Costa Rica